Umirovo (Ümär) is a rural locality (a selo) in Kileyevsky Selsoviet, Bakalinsky District, Bashkortostan, Russia. The population was 471 as of 2010. There are 3 streets.

Geography 
Umirovo is located 16 km north of Bakaly (the district's administrative centre) by road. Kileyevo is the nearest rural locality.

References 

Rural localities in Bakalinsky District